Eva Bexell (born 1945) is a Swedish author of children's books. She debuted in 1976 with the book Prostens barnbarn. Her books have been translated to Danish, English, Finnish, Japanese, Norwegian and German, and as of November 2007, sold over 560,000 copies.

The three books with morfar prosten has been released as audio books, with Margaretha Krook as narrator. Prostens barnbarn and Kalabalik hos morfar prosten was broadcast as a radio series in 1975, and Opp och hoppa, morfar prosten! was recorded in 1992.

Bibliography
 1976: Prostens barnbarn 
 1978: Kalabalik hos morfar prosten 
 1980: En vän är en vän 
 1983: Flickan i gullregnsträdet 
 1987: Opp och hoppa, morfar prosten! 
 1989: Olycksfågeln Evert 
 1992: Evert i ny knipa 
 1998: Ser du inte hur det ryker ur skorstenen? 
Source: Nationalencyklopedin

A collection edition, Boken om morfar prosten, was published in 1989. It includes the three books about morfar prosten: Prostens barnbarn, Kalabalik hos morfar prosten and Opp och hoppa, morfar prosten!.

Awards
 1987: BMF-plaketten (children's book)
 2003: Emilpriset

References

Swedish-language writers
Swedish children's writers
Swedish women children's writers
1945 births
Living people